Nashville Soccer Club U-23 was an American professional soccer team based in Nashville, Tennessee. The team played only one season in the Premier Development League in 2017. It served as the under-23 team for Nashville SC of the United Soccer League.

History 

The club was announced in September 2016. It is owned by the ownership group of Nashville SC: David Dill, president and chief operating officer of LifePoint Health; Christopher Redhage, co-founder of ProviderTrust, a health care software company, and former pro soccer player; and Marcus Whitney, president of Jumpstart Foundry, a health care innovation fund, and former chairman of Nashville FC, the city's existing amateur team.

They finished third in the PDL South Atlantic Division with 8 wins, 4 ties and 2 losses and barely missed the playoffs. Martim Galvao was the leading scorer with 7 goals.

Year-by-year

Roster

References

External links
 Official Site

2016 establishments in Tennessee
Association football clubs established in 2016
Sports in Nashville, Tennessee
USL League Two teams